Dolichosomastis is a genus of moths of the family Erebidae. The genus was erected by George Hampson in 1924.

Species
Dolichosomastis archadia Stoll, 1790
Dolichosomastis dorsilinea Dyar, 1910
Dolichosomastis hannibal Schaus, 1914
Dolichosomastis leucogrammica Hampson, 1924

References

Calpinae